Elisabet Borsiin Bonnier (born in 1950) is a Swedish diplomat.

Since 1973 she is working for Swedish Foreign Ministry. 1998-2003 she was Ambassador of Sweden to Estonia.

Awards:
 2003: Order of the Cross of Terra Mariana, I class

References

Living people
1950 births
Swedish diplomats